The Great Britain women's national artistic gymnastics team represents Great Britain in FIG international competitions. After winning the bronze medal at the 1928 Olympics, the British team have placed consistently well in modern-day 21st-century artistic gymnastics. In October 2015, they won their first team World medal, taking home a bronze medal.

History
Great Britain has participated in the Olympic Games women's team competition 13 times. It has won two bronze medals, at the 1928 and the 2020 Olympic Games. The team has also made 22 appearances at the World Artistic Gymnastics Championships.

Current senior roster

Team competition results

Olympic Games
 1928 —  Bronze medal
Annie Broadbent, Lucy Desmond, Margaret Hartley, Amy Jagger, Isabel Judd, Jessie Kite, Marjorie Moreman, Edith Pickles, Ethel Seymour, Ada Smith, Hilda Smith, Doris Woods
 1936 — 8th place
Doris Blake, Brenda Crowe, Edna Gross, Clarice Hanson, Mary Heaton, Mary Kelly, Lilian Ridgewell, Marion Wharton
 1948 — 9th place
Joan Airey, Cissy Davies, Pat Evans, Dorothy Hey, Irene Hirst, Pat Hirst, Audrey Rennard, Dorothy Smith
 1952 — 16th place
Cissy Davies, Irene Hirst, Pat Hirst, Gwynedd Lewis-Lingard, Margo Morgan, Valerie Mullins, Marjorie Raistrick-Carter, Margaret Thomas-Neale
 1956 — did not participate
 1960 — 17th place
Gwynedd Lewis-Lingard, Pat Perks, Jill Pollard, Marjorie Raistrick-Carter, Dorothy Summers, Margaret Thomas-Neale
 1964 — did not participate
 1968 — did not participate
 1972 — 18th place
Barbara Alred, Pamela Hopkins, Pamela Hutchinson, Avril Lennox, Yvonne Mugridge, Elaine Willett
 1976 — did not participate
 1980 — did not participate
 1984 — 7th place
Natalie Davies, Amanda Harrison, Sally Larner, Hayley Price, Kathleen Williams, Lisa Young
 1988 — did not participate
 1992 — did not participate
 1996 — did not participate
 2000 — 10th place
Kelly Hackman, Lisa Mason, Sharna Murray, Annika Reeder, Paula Thomas, Emma Williams
 2004 — 11th place
Cherrelle Fennell, Vanessa Hobbs, Katy Lennon, Elizabeth Line, Beth Tweddle, Nicola Willis
 2008 — 9th place
Imogen Cairns, Becky Downie, Marissa King, Beth Tweddle, Hannah Whelan, Rebecca Wing
 2012 — 6th place
Imogen Cairns, Jennifer Pinches, Rebecca Tunney, Beth Tweddle, Hannah Whelan
 2016 — 5th place
Ellie Downie, Rebecca Downie, Claudia Fragapane, Ruby Harrold, Amy Tinkler
 2020 –  Bronze medal
Jennifer Gadirova, Jessica Gadirova, Alice Kinsella, Amelie Morgan

World Championships

 1934 — did not participate
 1938 — did not participate
 1950 — did not participate
 1954 — did not participate
 1958 — did not participate
 1962 — did not participate
 1966 — 17th place
Margaret Bell, Rita Francis, Marie Gough, Diana Lodge, Linda Parkin, Mary Prestidge
 1970 — 19th place
Barbara Alred, Pamela Hopkins, Pamela Hutchinson, Susan Lowther, Yvonne Mugridge, Maureen Potts
 1974 — 17th place
 1978 — 16th place
 1979 — 16th place
Susan Cheesebrough, Sally Crabtree, Suzanne Dando, Mandy Gornall, Denise Jones, Kathleen Williams
 1981 — 12th place
Mandy Gornall, Denise Jones, Hayley Price, Cheryl Weatherstone, Kathleen Williams, Lisa Young
 1983 — 17th place
Jackie Bevan, Natalie Davies, Amanda Harrison, Hayley Price, Kathleen Williams, Lisa Young
 1985 — 16th place
Lisa Elliott, Sally Larner, Jackie McCarthy, Stephanie Micklam, Hayley Price, Lisa Young
 1987 — 17th place
Catherine Bain, Lisa Elliott, Lisa Grayson, Karen Hargate, Karen Kennedy, Joanna Prescott
 1989 — 15th place
Lisa Elliott, Lisa Grayson, Lorna Mainwaring, Sarah Mercer, Joanna Prescott, Louise Redding
 1991 — 17th place
Jackie Brady, Sarah Mercer, Louise Redding, Rowena Roberts, Laura Timmins, Natasha Whitehead
 1994 — 12th place
Anna-Liese Acklam, Gemma Cuff, Gabby Fuchs, Andrea Leman, Zita Lusack, Annika Reeder, Karin Szymko
 1995 — 18th place
Gemma Cuff, Gabby Fuchs, Michaela Knox, Sonia Lawrence, Zita Lusack, Annika Reeder, Karin Szymko
 1997 — 13th place
Jenny Cox, Gemma Cuff, Sonia Lawrence, Jannie Mortimer, Sharna Murray, Annika Reeder
 1999 — 11th place
Rochelle Douglas, Natalie Lucitt, Lisa Mason, Holly Murdock, Sharna Murray, Annika Reeder
 2001 — 9th place
Holly Murdock, Beth Tweddle, Melissa Wilcox, Emma Williams, Nicola Willis
 2003 — 9th place
Amy Dodsley, Cherrelle Fennell, Vanessa Hobbs, Elizabeth Line, Rebecca Mason, Beth Tweddle
 2006 — 11th place
Olivia Bryl, Lynette Lisle, Leigh Rogers, Beth Tweddle, Emma White, Aisling Williams
 2007 — 7th place
Hannah Clowes, Becky Downie, Marissa King, Beth Tweddle, Aisling Williams, Rebecca Wing
 2010 — 7th place
Imogen Cairns, Becky Downie, Nicole Hibbert, Beth Tweddle, Hannah Whelan
 2011 — 5th place
Imogen Cairns, Becky Downie, Danusia Francis, Jennifer Pinches, Beth Tweddle, Hannah Whelan
 2014 — 6th place
Becky Downie, Claudia Fragapane, Ruby Harrold, Gabrielle Jupp, Kelly Simm, Hannah Whelan
 2015 —  bronze medal
Becky Downie, Ellie Downie, Claudia Fragapane, Ruby Harrold, Kelly Simm, Amy Tinkler, Charlie Fellows
 2018 — 9th place
Becky Downie, Ellie Downie, Georgia-Mae Fenton, Alice Kinsella, Kelly Simm
 2019 — 6th place
Becky Downie, Ellie Downie, Georgia-Mae Fenton, Taeja James, Alice Kinsella
 2022 —  silver medal
Ondine Achampong, Georgia-Mae Fenton, Jennifer Gadirova, Jessica Gadirova, Alice Kinsella, Poppy-Grace Stickler

Junior World Championships
2019 — 6th place
Jennifer Gadirova, Jessica Gadirova, Alia Leat

Most decorated gymnasts
This list includes all British female artistic gymnasts who have won a medal at the Olympic Games or the World Artistic Gymnastics Championships.

Best international results

See also 
List of Olympic female artistic gymnasts for Great Britain
 Great Britain men's national artistic gymnastics team

References

Gymnastics in the United Kingdom
National women's artistic gymnastics teams
Women's national sports teams of the United Kingdom
Women's gymnastics